Morris Young may refer to:
B. Morris Young (1854–1931), American missionary
Morris Young (entomologist) (1822–1897), Scottish entomologist
Morris A. Young, sheriff of Gadsden County, Florida from 2004